White Lies is a movie, directed by Ken Selden, with Larry Gilliard Jr. and Julie Warner playing the main characters Leon Turner and  Mimi Furst.

The plot is a love story between a young 'white' woman and a young 'black' man.

It is a story of overcoming racist prejudices, and about how a little lie can have big consequences, and about trust each other, and in the end: what chances are unfolded by forgiveness, when somebody regrets his mistake.

The year it was made and/or published is variably cited as 1995 (NY Times), 1996 (German Wikipedia site), and 1997 (several television journals / IMDB).

References

External links 
 

1996 films
1990s romance films